A synthetic element is one of 24 known chemical elements that do not occur naturally on Earth: they have been created by human manipulation of fundamental particles in a nuclear reactor, a particle accelerator, or the explosion of an atomic bomb; thus, they are called "synthetic", "artificial", or "man-made". The synthetic elements are those with atomic numbers 95–118, as shown in purple on the accompanying periodic table: these 24 elements were first created between 1944 and 2010. The mechanism for the creation of a synthetic element is to force additional protons into the nucleus of an element with an atomic number lower than 95. All known (see: Island of Stability) synthetic elements are unstable, but they decay at widely varying rates: the half-lives of their longest-lived isotopes range from microseconds to millions of years. 

Five more elements that were first created artificially are strictly speaking not synthetic because they were later found in nature in trace quantities: 43Tc, 61Pm, 85At, 93Np, and 94Pu, though are sometimes classified as synthetic alongside exclusively artificial elements. The first, technetium, was created in 1937. Plutonium (Pu, atomic number 94), first synthesized in 1940, is another such element. It is the element with the largest number of protons (atomic number) to occur in nature, but it does so in such tiny quantities that it is far more practical to synthesize it. Plutonium is known mainly for its use in atomic bombs and nuclear reactors.

No elements with atomic numbers greater than 99 have any uses outside of scientific research, since they have extremely short half-lives, and thus have never been produced in large quantities.

Properties
All elements with atomic number greater than 94 decay quickly enough into lighter elements such that any atoms of these that may have existed when the Earth formed (about 4.6 billion years ago) have long since decayed. Synthetic elements now present on Earth are the product of atomic bombs or experiments that involve nuclear reactors or particle accelerators, via nuclear fusion or neutron absorption.

Atomic mass for natural elements is based on weighted average abundance of natural isotopes in Earth's crust and atmosphere. For synthetic elements, there is no "natural isotope abundance". Therefore, for synthetic elements the total nucleon count (protons plus neutrons) of the most stable isotope, i.e., the isotope with the longest half-life—is listed in brackets as the atomic mass.

History

Technetium
The first element to be synthesized, rather than discovered in nature, was technetium in 1937. This discovery filled a gap in the periodic table, and the fact that technetium has no stable isotopes explains its natural absence on Earth (and the gap). With the longest-lived isotope of technetium, 97Tc, having a 4.21-million-year half-life, no technetium remains from the formation of the Earth. Only minute traces of technetium occur naturally in Earth's crust—as a product of spontaneous fission of 238U, or from neutron capture in molybdenum—but technetium is present naturally in red giant stars.

Curium 
The first entirely synthetic element to be made was curium, synthesized in 1944 by Glenn T. Seaborg, Ralph A. James, and Albert Ghiorso by bombarding plutonium with alpha particles.

Eight others
Synthesis of americium, berkelium, and californium followed soon. Einsteinium and fermium were discovered by a team of scientists led by Albert Ghiorso in 1952 while studying the composition of radioactive debris from the detonation of the first hydrogen bomb. The isotopes synthesized were einsteinium-253, with a half-life of 20.5 days, and fermium-255, with a half-life of about 20 hours. The creation of mendelevium, nobelium, and lawrencium followed.

Rutherfordium and dubnium  
During the height of the Cold War, teams from the Soviet Union and the United States independently created rutherfordium and dubnium. The naming and credit for synthesis of these elements remained unresolved for many years, but eventually shared credit was recognized by IUPAC/IUPAP in 1992. In 1997, IUPAC decided to give dubnium its current name honoring the city of Dubna where the Russian team worked since American-chosen names had already been used for many existing synthetic elements, while the name rutherfordium (chosen by the American team) was accepted for element 104.

The last thirteen 
Meanwhile, the American team had created seaborgium, and the next six elements had been created by a German team: bohrium, hassium, meitnerium, darmstadtium, roentgenium, and copernicium. Element 113, nihonium, was created by a Japanese team; the last five known elements, flerovium, moscovium, livermorium, tennessine, and oganesson, were created by Russian–American collaborations and complete the seventh row of the periodic table.

List of synthetic elements

The following elements do not occur naturally on Earth. All are transuranium elements and have atomic numbers of 95 and higher.

Other elements usually produced through synthesis
All elements with atomic numbers 1 through 94 occur naturally at least in trace quantities, but the following elements are often produced through synthesis. Technetium, promethium, astatine, neptunium, and plutonium were discovered through synthesis before being found in nature.

References

External links

Nuclear physics
 
Lists of chemical elements